Natthaphong Phonoppharat (born 16 May 1988) is a Thai competitive windsurfer. He competed at the 2016 Summer Olympics in Rio de Janeiro, in the men's RS:X.

References

External links
 
 
 
 
 

1988 births
Living people
Natthaphong Phonoppharat
Natthaphong Phonoppharat
Natthaphong Phonoppharat
Sailors at the 2016 Summer Olympics – RS:X
Natthaphong Phonoppharat
Asian Games medalists in sailing
Sailors at the 2014 Asian Games
Sailors at the 2018 Asian Games
Medalists at the 2014 Asian Games
Natthaphong Phonoppharat
Southeast Asian Games medalists in sailing
Competitors at the 2007 Southeast Asian Games
Natthaphong Phonoppharat
Sailors at the 2020 Summer Olympics – RS:X
Natthaphong Phonoppharat